Mechouar Mosque is a historic mosque in the city of Tlemcen, Algeria. The mosque is a part of the historic Mechouar Castle which has a significant place in the history of the Kingdom of Tlemcen. The mosque contributed greatly to the intellectual development of Tlemcen. It was one of the main sights during the selection of Tlemcen as the Capital of Islamic Culture in 2011.

History
The mosque was built following the castle by Abu Hammu I in 1310. It played a substantial role for Islamic intellectual development in Tlemcen, and there generations of ulamas had taught and had been taught. It was renovated several times by the Turks. However, it was converted by the French into a church in 1840, and the original roof was stripped off at the same time. During the French occupation, Tlemcen and the mosque became a center for Christianity. Later the mosque was sacked and turned into a warehouse for the military hospital. The mosque only regained its original function after the independence of Algeria.

Architecture
The mosque has no sahn and the minaret is the only part surviving in its original form. The minaret is square-shaped and covered with daylighting. Four facades of the mosque are decorated with Zellige tiles and clays. The lower part of the minaret is covered with rectangular panel surrounded by Zellige squares with a metallic luster. The minaret is the only one decorated by Zellige in Tlemcen.

Gallery

See also
  Lists of mosques 
  List of mosques in Africa
  List of mosques in Algeria
 List of cultural assets of Algeria

References

Bibliography
 بورويبة، ' الفن الديني الإسلامي بالجزائر، الجزائر : SNED، 1983.
 ج. مارسي، ' الهندسة المعمارية للغرب الإسلامي'، تونس، الجزائر، المغرب وإسبانيا وصقلية.باريس : الفنون والحرف التصويرية، عام 1957.
 ج. مارصي.، فهرست ' الفن المعماري وتونس والجزائر والمغرب وأسبانيا وصقلية وباريس : أ بيكار، 1926.
 ج. مارصي. الآثار العربية تلمسان، باريس : أ. فونتموانغ، 1905.
 بارجس، تلمسان العاصمة القديمة لمملكة ذات نفس الاسم. باريس : دوبراة، 1859.

14th-century mosques
Mosques in Tlemcen
Zayyanid architecture